Skin & Bone is the eleventh studio album by The Angels, released in March 1998 and reached No. 29 on the ARIA Albums Chart.

Track listing

Personnel
The Angels
Doc Neeson – lead vocals
Rick Brewster – lead guitar, producer, engineer
John Brewster – rhythm guitar, backing vocals
Jim Hilbun – bass guitar, backing vocals
Brent Eccles – drums

Production
Mike Duffy, Julian Slade – engineers
Kevin Shirley – mixing
Ted Jensen – mastering

Charts

References

External links
[ Skin & Bone at allmusic.com]
Skin & Bone at amazon.com

1998 albums
The Angels (Australian band) albums
Shock Records albums